The Bandiat is a small river in western France, a left tributary of the Tardoire. It flows through the Haute-Vienne, Dordogne and Charente departments.

Geography

The Bandiat begins its course just south of the Puy Chauvet (488 m), at roughly 440 m above sea level, near the settlement of Grand Puyconnieux (commune of Dournazac) in the Haute-Vienne department.  The river flows first to the southwest and then turns northwest in the Dordogne and, at high water level, empties into the Tardoire (Charente basin) near Agris in the Charente. Otherwise, the river disappears near Les Vieilles Vaures (commune of Agris) about 5 km before reaching the Tardoire. All the water drains away in several sinkholes in the karst only to reappear near Angoulême as springs of the river Touvre, a tributary of the Charente.

Hydrology

The discharge of the Bandiat was measured near Feuillade as 0.6 m³/s in the summer and 6 m³/s in the winter.

Communes by the river
Abjat-sur-Bandiat
Nontron
Javerlhac
Feuillade
Marthon
Saint-Germain-de-Montbron
Chazelles
Pranzac
Rivières
Agris

Gallery

References

Rivers of France
Rivers of Nouvelle-Aquitaine
Rivers of Vienne
Rivers of Dordogne
Rivers of Charente